Kagojer Phul (The Paper Flower) is an unfinished Bangladeshi epic drama film. The film is based on the life of Tareque Masud's father. Based on Tareque's story the screenplay was co-written by Tareque and Catherine Masud. Kagojer Phul will be a prequel set on the younger life of Masud’s father, who portrayals in Matir Moina.

Background
On 13 August 2011, Tareque Masud and media personality Mishuk Munier died in a road accident while returning to Dhaka from Manikganj on the Dhaka-Aricha highway after visiting the filming location of Kagojer Phul.  Bangladesh prime minister Sheikh Hasina assured to extend her support for making the film. Hasina said, "Muktir Gaan was a bright ray of light in the dark. She also said, I will extend my support to complete the works of Kagojer Phul.

Pre-production
In 2012, they received a grant from the National Film Grant award from the Bangladesh Government for the production of films.
Jayanta Chattopadhyay is to be one of the actors of the film.

Cast
 Jayanta Chattopadhyay as Kazi

Sequel

A sequel titled Matir Moina was released in 2002. The film is set against the backdrop of unrest period in East Pakistan in the late 1960s leading up to the Bangladesh War of Liberation. Kagojer Phul, would follow younger Kazi, the main character of Matir Moina'' (based on Masud's father), and zoom in on his years in Calcutta (now Kolkata) from 1945 to 1947. The film would show how Kazi's character was shaped by the riots in Calcutta and partition of Bengal.

References

External links

2010s unfinished films
2010s drama films
Bengali-language Bangladeshi films
Bangladeshi drama films
Tareque Masud